Flensburg-Schäferhaus Airport is a regional airport in Germany .  It supports general aviation with no commercial airline service scheduled.

History
During World War II, the airport was used by the British Royal Air Force as Advanced Landing Ground B-166 Flensburg.

References
 World Aero Data Flensburg-Schäferhaus Airport
 The Airport Guide Flensburg-Schäferhaus Airport
 Johnson, David C. (1988), U.S. Army Air Forces Continental Airfields (ETO), D-Day to V-E Day; Research Division, USAF Historical Research Center, Maxwell AFB, Alabama.

External links

Airports in Schleswig-Holstein